English records in athletics are the best performances in athletics events by athletes representing England which are ratified by England Athletics (EA), or formerly the Amateur Athletic Association of England (AAA).

Key to tables

Performances marked with an asterisk (*) maybe a) not ratifiable or b) currently under further review

+ = en route to a longer distance

A = affected by altitude

! = timing by photo-electric cell

a = aided road course according to IAAF rule 260.28

Mx = mark was made in a mixed race

X = annulled due to doping violation

# = not recognised by federation

est = estimate

Outdoor

Men

Women

Indoor

Men

Women

Mixed

References

Athletics in England
Athletics
English
England sport-related lists